Dordt University is a private evangelical Christian university in Sioux Center, Iowa. It was founded in 1955 and is affiliated with the Christian Reformed Church in North America. The university name is a reference to the Synod of Dordt (Dordrecht).

Dordt annually enrolls about 1,500 students. The university is committed to a Reformed, Christian perspective that embraces the Bible as the word of God. The university offers 90 programs of study that lead to Associate of Arts, Bachelor of Arts, Bachelor of Science in Engineering, Bachelor of Social Work, Bachelor of Science in Nursing, and Master of Education degrees.

History 
Dordt University was founded as Midwest Christian Junior College in 1953. In 1954, a group of men from local Christian Reformed Churches in Iowa, South Dakota and Minnesota agreed to establish the college in Sioux Center. It was tentatively referred to as Midwest Christian Junior College, and the first classes were held at the college in the fall of 1955 with about 40 students.

In April 1956, the name was changed to Dordt College. This name was chosen to honor a historic 17th century Reformed church meeting called the Synod of Dordt that took place in the Netherlands in 1618–19.

The first graduating class consisted of 18 students in 1957. The first students to earn B.A. degrees graduated in 1965. The college changed its name to Dordt University on May 13, 2019.

Academics 
Dordt offers over 90 programs of study with over 40 majors and 11 pre-professional programs of study. The core is drawn from various academic disciplines—such as language, natural science, and social science. These courses integrate the character and scope of Christian perspective. They provide insight into the nature and demands of contemporary Christian living and help students understand how various aspects of contemporary life are interrelated and how the global culture has developed. These general education courses also supply students with the basic quantitative, analytic, lingual, and physical skills that are essential to the program overall and to their tasks as citizens.

Dordt is accredited to grant bachelor and Master of Education degrees by the Higher Learning Commission. Furthermore, the engineering program is ABET accredited, the nursing program is accredited by the National League for Nursing and the Iowa Board of Nursing and the social work program is accredited by the Council on Social Work Education.

Dordt offers more than 25 off-campus study opportunities in countries around the world through its affiliation with the Council for Christian Colleges and Universities. These countries include Australia, China, France, Ghana, Honduras, Hungary, Mexico, the Netherlands, Spain, Uganda, and the United Kingdom. Off-campus programs also exist for Chicago, Washington D.C., and Los Angeles.

Ninety-eight percent of students receive financial aid in the form of scholarships, grants, loans, and work-study opportunities. The university awards scholarships based on academic potential and performance (e.g., the Kuyper Honors program), activities (e.g., sports, theater, music), and demonstrated financial need. Over $18.5 million is awarded in financial aid annually, thanks in large part to private donors and alumni.

In 2022, Dordt was ranked number one in Student Engagement for the sixth year in the row by The Wall Street Journal.

Campus 
The campus covers a  area and includes 25 buildings, eleven for student housing.

The hub of the campus is the Campus Center. The  facility was constructed in 2002 at a cost of $12.5 million and is open continuously during the academic year.  The entry level consists of a campus store, an art gallery, meditation rooms, and a student lounge. The upper level features enhanced-technology classrooms, conference rooms, and various offices. The lower-level houses an activity center, a dining area, a snack bar, and Campus Health. The basement features a recording studio and a game room complete with a four-lane regulation-size bowling alley, as well as foosball and pool tables.

Academic facilities 
The campus center is the John and Louise Hulst Library, which houses a collection of more than 300,000 book volumes, 16,000 print journal volumes, and 163,000 microtext units. The library subscribes to more than 600 journals, magazines, and newspapers, and has electronic access to another 10,000 titles. In addition to providing print and electronic resources, the library serves the campus media needs by offering checkout availability of various media equipment. The library has a significant collection of curriculum and children's literature materials housed in the Learning Resource Center. Other specialized collections include the Dordt University Archives and the Dutch Memorial Collection.

The Science and Technology Center at has 180- and 80-seat lecture halls, a greenhouse, laboratories, general-use classrooms, and various science departmental offices. There are laboratories for organic chemistry, physical chemistry and physics. It also houses agriculture facilities for animal science and agronomy labs. The engineering wing includes labs for mechanical engineering, electronics, electrical engineering, and computer-aided design. The Science and Technology Center is connected to the Campus Center via a sky walk, which was constructed in 2017.

B. J. Haan Auditorium 
The B. J. Haan Auditorium seats approximately 1,500 people and is used for chapel services, concerts, organ recitals, and other regional events. Convocation and commencement exercises are also held in "the Beej", as it is called by students. The auditorium features a three-manual, tracker-action Casavant Frères organ with 37 stops, 57 ranks, and 2,865 pipes.

The auditorium is adjoined by the Music Building, which also has rehearsal rooms, studios and classrooms, vocal and instrumental practice rooms, and music faculty offices. Its mezzanine also houses the International Association for the Promotion of Christian Higher Education.

The auditorium was the site of a campaign rally by candidate Donald J. Trump on January 23, 2016, during the race for the 2016 Iowa Republican presidential caucuses.

Athletic facilities 
The campus recreation center hosts the Health, Physical Education, and Recreation (HPER) departmental facilities and the athletics offices. The Rec Center includes basketball, volleyball and racquetball courts, an aerobics room, a weight room, a 200-meter indoor track, and a batting cage.

The All Seasons Center was built in 2004 and contains an NHL-sized hockey rink, waterslides, a lap pool, and both indoor and outdoor family aquatic pools. This US$9 million facility is shared by Dordt College and the city of Sioux Center and received the Iowa League of Cities 2002 All-Star Community Award. It is the home ice for the Dordt Blades club hockey team.

Athletics 
The Dordt athletic teams are called the Defenders. The university is a member of the National Association of Intercollegiate Athletics (NAIA), primarily competing in the Great Plains Athletic Conference (GPAC) since the 2000–01 academic year. The Defenders previously competed in the defunct South Dakota Intercollegiate Conference (SDIC) from 1995–96 to 1999–2000.

Dordt competes in 18 intercollegiate varsity sports: Men's sports include baseball, basketball, cross country, football, golf, ice hockey, soccer, track & field and volleyball; while women's sports include basketball, cheerleading, cross country, dance, golf, soccer, softball, track & field and volleyball.

Cross Country 
In 2022, the men’s team won the NAIA cross country championships with a final score of 97 points. This was the first national championship for any athletic program in Dordt history.

Basketball 
In 2014, the Defenders set a record for points scored by both teams in the NAIA National Basketball Tournament.

Club sports 
Dordt University also sponsors the following club sport:

 Men's lacrosse (Dordt Sowers) (Great Rivers Lacrosse Conference)

References

External links 
 Official website
 Official athletics website

 
Liberal arts colleges in Iowa
Universities and colleges affiliated with the Christian Reformed Church
Educational institutions established in 1955
Education in Sioux County, Iowa
Buildings and structures in Sioux County, Iowa
1955 establishments in Iowa
Council for Christian Colleges and Universities
Sioux Center, Iowa
Great Plains Athletic Conference schools
Private universities and colleges in Iowa